Chapter XV of the United Nations Charter deals with the UN Secretariat. It designates the UN Secretary-General as the chief administrative officer of the organization, which includes the staff of ECOSOC, the Trusteeship Council, and other organs. Similarly to how the US Constitution requires the US President to deliver a State of the Union address to the US Congress, Article 98 of the UN Charter requires the Secretary-General to "make an annual report to the General Assembly on the work of the Organization." Article 101 specifies criteria for employment at the UN, stating, "The paramount consideration in the employment of the staff and in the determination of the conditions of service shall be the necessity of securing the highest standards of efficiency, competence, and integrity. Due regard shall be paid to the importance of recruiting the staff on as wide a geographical basis as possible." Chapter XV is analogous to Article 6 of the Covenant of the League of Nations.

References

Divisions and sections of the Charter of the United Nations
United Nations Secretariat